Carrots/KKKKK is a split record between Excepter and Animal Collective member Panda Bear. It was limited to 1,000 copies. This is Panda Bear's third single from his 2007 album Person Pitch.

Song information
"Carrots" consists of two sections: "Good Girl" and "Carrots". "Good Girl" lasts for the first four and a half minutes, and then segues into "Carrots", which itself consists of two separate sections, the last one starting at the eight minute mark. The first section contains a sample of "Radio Calcutta #2" from the Sublime Frequencies album "Radio India: The Eternal Dream Of Sound". The second part contains samples of "Enter the Dragon" by Lee "Scratch" Perry and "Someday" by Kylie Minogue, and the last section of the song contains a sample taken from Kraftwerk's song "Ananas Symphonie" ("Pineapple Symphony") from their 1973 album Ralf und Florian. The interplay between the song's three movements illustrates a statement made by Panda in an interview on Ma Fama radio, in which he discussed the idea of performing songs the way a DJ would play records, blending samples that have different BPM which would result in discordant polyrhythms.

Excepter's side contains fragments of two live versions of "Knock Knock", whose lyrics are inspired by the traditional folk song illustrated on the sleeve, "King Kong Kitchie Kitchie Ki Me O".

Track listing
Side A – "Carrots":

 "Good Girl"
 "Carrots"

Side B – "KKKKK":
 
 "Lypse 2"
 "Who's There"
 "Knock Knock"
 "Jrone (Four)"
 "O Rly?"

External links
 Junkmedia Review
1Interview and performance on Ma Fama radio

2007 songs
2007 singles
Panda Bear (musician) songs
Split singles